400 Blows is a Los Angeles-based band, formed in 1997, and is signed to Gold Standard Laboratories. The group's sound incorporates elements of hardcore punk and heavy metal, and their live shows have been noted for their ferocity. After 3.19.98 in 1999, in 2000 the band released Black Rainbow, and their third LP was 2006's Angel's Trumpets and Devil's Trombones. The band famously designed the iconic "Salvation" sign at Silverlake Lounge.

Members

Current
Skot Alexander - Vocals 
Scott Martin - Guitar
Kevin Fitzgerald - Drums

Former
Christian Moreno (Wabschall) - Guitar
Ferdinand - Drums/Guitar
Bryce - Guitar
Joseph - Drums

Discography
3.19.98 (1999), Total Annihilation
Black Rainbow (Rehash Records, 2003)
The Sore Thumb EP (Gold Standard Laboratories, 2005)
Angel's Trumpets and Devil's Trombones (Gold Standard Laboratories, Narnack Records, 2005)
The Average Guy (Buddyhead Records, 2006)
Sickness and Health (ORG Music, 2011)

References

External links
400 Blows Official Facebook

Musical groups established in 1997
Musical groups from Los Angeles
Rock music groups from California